Bude Sea Pool is a partially man-made tidal swimming pool or lido in the rocks at Summerleaze Beach, Bude, Cornwall.

History
In 1930, The Thynne family put up half the money to create the pool and its sunbathing terraces.

Overview
Its size is 290 x 140 feet (approximate dimensions, as the pool is not symmetrical) with an area of about 3,500m². The volume is about 4000 m³ or 880,000 gallons, depending on how much sand the sea washes in.

RNLI and the Bude Surf Lifesaving Club use the pool for training and exams.

The pool is open 365 days a year, but only lifeguarded by RNLI during high seasons.
On 19 October 2010 BBC Cornwall reported that the pool may face funding cuts as part of Cornwall Council's spending review. The possibility of cuts has drawn significant levels of protest from residents of Bude and beyond.

The Friends of Bude Sea Pool, a volunteer charity organisation, was formed in May 2011. The group aims to preserve, improve and enhance the sea pool as an amenity for the benefit of the community and visitors to the town.

References

External links

 Friends of Bude Sea Pool
 Lidos in the UK
 Vandalism article, 5 August 2009
 Petition against closure, 10 November 2010

Lidos
1930 establishments in England
Bude
Buildings and structures completed in 1930